The Northern Amazon Ecological Corridor is a proposed ecological corridor connecting conservation units and indigenous territories in the north of the Amazon rainforest of Brazil.

Background

The first version of the Ecological Corridors of Tropical Forests of Brazil proposal was developed by a group of consultants at the request of the Brazilian Ministry of the Environment and presented in the first half of 1997.
Seven major corridors were proposed: the Central Amazon Ecological Corridor, Northern Amazon Ecological Corridor, South Amazon Ecological Corridor, South Amazon Ecotones Ecological Corridor, Western Amazon Ecological Corridor, Central Atlantic Forest Ecological Corridor and Serra do Mar Ecological Corridor.
These corresponded to about 25% of the rainforests of Brazil.
Priority was given to the Central Amazon Corridor and the Central Atlantic Forest Corridor, which would test and develop the concepts for use with the subsequent corridors.

Proposed scope
The Northern Amazon Ecological Corridor was one of five Amazon region corridors identified.
It would cover the northern Amazon border with Colombia and Venezuela.
There would be six priority areas in three main Amazon ecoregions. 
The corridor was identified as being relatively intact, globally important for its biological distinction, and high priority on a regional scale.

Conservation units would include the Amazonas National Forest,  Maracá Ecological Station, Pico da Neblina National Park and Roraima National Forest.
The proposal also included the Cubaté, Cuiari, Içana, Pari Cachoeira II, Piraiauara, Tarauacá I, Tarauacá II and Uruçu national forests.
However, these were among 11 national forests created by President José Sarney on 23 November 1989 and 9 March 1990 that were revoked by his successor President Fernando Collor de Mello on 5 September 1991. 
The forests had been created without considering the claims of the indigenous people.

Notes

Sources

Ecological corridors of Brazil
Amazon basin
Environment of Amazonas (Brazilian state)
Environment of Roraima
Guayana Highlands
Rio Negro (Amazon)